Namur Lake Airport  is located to the southwest of Namur Lake, Alberta, Canada.

References

Registered aerodromes in Alberta
Transport in the Regional Municipality of Wood Buffalo